Self-Portrait or Portrait of an Old Man is an oil on canvas painting by El Greco, dating to between 1595 and 1600 and usually identified as a self-portrait. It shows the influence of Titian and Tintoretto, picked up by El Greco in Venice. It is now in the Metropolitan Museum of Art in New York.

Bibliography 
  ÁLVAREZ LOPERA, José, El Greco, Madrid, Arlanza, 2005, Biblioteca «Descubrir el Arte», (colección «Grandes maestros»). .
  SCHOLZ-HÄNSEL, Michael, El Greco, Colonia, Taschen, 2003. .

References

External links
 ArteHistoria.com. «Autorretrato» [Consulta: 01.01.2011].

Portraits by El Greco
1590s paintings
El Greco
Paintings in the collection of the Metropolitan Museum of Art
Portraits of men
16th-century portraits